A historical society (sometimes also preservation society) is an organization dedicated to preserving, collecting, researching, and interpreting historical information or items. Originally, these societies were created as a way to help future generations understand their heritage.

Historical societies vary in specialization, with focuses ranging from specific geographical areas such as countries or towns, universities, railways, ethnic and religious groups, to genealogy, pioneer history, and the preservation of antiques or historic buildings.

Often, many of these organizations ensure that historic architecture is preserved/restored and period houses are maintained for tours open to the public.

History
It is said that historical societies originated in Western Europe during the 16th and 17th centuries. These early organizations were usually formed as societies for “lovers of Antiquity.”

The oldest historical society in the United States is what is now called the Massachusetts Historical Society, which was founded in 1791 by Jeremy Belknap. He was joined by nine other Bostonians who helped him create "The Historical Society," an organization truly devoted to collecting materials for the study of American history. This like-minded group gathered family papers, books, and artifacts from their personal collections which led to the creation of the nation's first historical repository. Due to the absence of any other American historical repositories during this time, the MHS took on a national role - Something that is still evident in its collections and publications. To this day, Belknap's original vision of preserving, collecting, making resources accessible, and communicating manuscripts that promote the study of Massachusetts as well as the nation is still thriving.

During the 19th century, societies were becoming more and more democratic in their membership policies, while large groups of people were still being excluded. However, when the Progressive Era came, these historical societies finally started being seen as "institutions with a capacity or obligation to serve the public." There started to become significant growth in the public’s interest in local history when the 20th century came around, and this was apparent with the overall concern for historic preservation of cities that were going through architectural and demographic changes.  In 1940, the increase in this appreciation was reflected once again by the founding of the American Association for State and Local History. Although the accomplishments of white men were the center of the mid-century historical societies, previously neglected groups, such as ethnic minorities and women, started to gain more attention within the academic circles as society progressed. The history of historical societies in the U.S. has often been responsive to the trends within the discipline of history, however they haven’t always responded to the evolution and changes in the same way and speed. The public inclusion movement is a great example of how the historical societies were sometimes challenged with juggling competing preservation priorities and liberal access policies.

Records
Publishing journals and maintaining museums is another way in which the historical societies showcase their collections, research, and field of study. For record keeping and educational purposes, many of the transactions and papers read at society meetings have been documented and published, as we see with such publications as:
 The Society’s (Quebec) “Transactions of the Literary and Historical Society of Quebec” published in 1831
 The Society’s (Maine) “Collections and Proceedings of the Maine Historical Society” published in 1893
 The Society’s (Boston) “Proceedings of the Massachusetts Historical Society” published in 1919
 The Cambridge University Press’ “Transactions of the Royal Historical Society” published in 2013

At times throughout history, certain records were also criticized. Written words were not always given the praise that was sought after; This is displayed quite vividly within the following quotes from “The American Historical Review.”

“The early reports of the American Historical Association contain much criticism of the work and publications of local historians and local historical societies, no less justifiable than it was sometimes scathing. …it was a president of the Massachusetts Historical Society by the name of Adams who declared that half of the publications of American historical societies could be swept from library shelves with no appreciable loss to learning.”

Funding
Support from outside sources and contributors has always played an important role in the life of historical societies. Various methods such as donations, memberships, annual funds, corporate giving, internships, volunteering, and renting specific historic spaces are continuing to help keep these nonprofit societies alive and growing.

Chartering
While historical societies originate in different ways, usually there is a small group of people who lay down the foundation for the formal organization of the society. Such things as statement of purpose, the organizational meeting, the constitution and bylaws, incorporation, corporate title, requirements, reviewing, recommendations, and petitioning are all elements of the highly involved creation of charting a historical society.

New York, unlike all of the other US states who view cultural agencies as nonprofit businesses, has unique ways with the creation process and sees them as educational organizations. The cultural agencies in NY are a significant part of the educational system and incorporate under Education Law rather than Corporation Law. These education corporations are also created by and are subject to the Board of Regents of the University of the State of New York.

An issuance of a charter (by petitioning the Board of Regents) is necessary for any museum or historical society who intends on organizing as a nonprofit education corporation. In order to satisfying Regents standards of quality, they must develop and go through the provisional to absolute chartering process.

The period of development starts with a provisional charter, which is a form of incorporation granted for a probationary three to five years to historical societies that have expectations of meeting Regents standards. This encourages the society to progress, and at the end of the provisional period, there is a choice to petition for extension or have the charter made absolute. An absolute charter is given to societies that meet the organizational and educational standards which leads to what is called, registration. When the organization has a record of financial stability, programmatic accomplishment, and a reputation for excellence, it is often successful in meeting the registration requirements. With this successful review and recommendation that the Regents allow an absolute charter, the historical society is then registered and gains this absolute charter. From this point on, the organization must submit annual reports in order to provide current information and accomplishments to the Regents.

See also
 List of historical societies

References

External links 

 American Historical Association
 Preservation at Historic New England
 Royal Historical Society
 The Historical Association
 Central European History Society